The Medal of Culture (Chinese:文化獎) is a Taiwanese civil decoration created in 2020.

There are three levels.

It was awarded for the first time in Paris on February 3, 2020.

References

Orders, decorations, and medals of the Republic of China
Awards established in 2020